Queen of the Summer Stars is a 1991 novel by Persia Woolley and is the second volume of the Guinevere trilogy that relate the Arthurian legend from the perspective of Guinevere. The novel introduces Lancelot and also outlines King Arthur's victory at the Battle of Badon Hill as well as his betrayal by his halfsister Morgan la Fay, the death of Merlin and the death of Morgause by her son Agravain Guinevere takes in and raises Mordred Morgause and Arthur's son  after Mordred is revealed to Guinevere as King Arthur's son.

References

External links
 Queen of the Summer Stars at Amazon.com

1990 novels
Modern Arthurian fiction
Historical novels
Novels set in sub-Roman Britain